Hermanus Carel du Preez (born  in Hartswater, South Africa) is a South African rugby union player for the Enisei-STM in the Rugby Premier League. He can play as a number eight, a flanker or a lock.

Career

Youth and Amateur rugby

Du Preez enrolled at the Stellenbosch Rugby Academy, where he earned a spot in the Western Province Amateur side.

In 2013, he represented his club side Durbanville-Bellville at the inaugural SARU Community Cup competition, helping them to win the Bowl Final, effectively finishing third. He scored three tries in the competition, including a brace in his side's 95–20 victory over Bloemfontein Police.

At the end of 2013, he represented  in the 2013 Under-21 Provincial Championship. He made seven appearances and scored two tries as he helped the side clinch the title.

Western Province

He was included in the  Vodacom Cup side for the 2013 Vodacom Cup competition. He made his first class debut on 9 March 2013, playing off the bench in a 17–17 draw against neighbours . He was involved in the 2013 SARU Community Cup for the next few weeks, but returned to the side – and into the starting line-up for the first time – for their match against Argentinean side .

After one more appearance in 2013, he returned to the side for the 2014 Vodacom Cup competition. He made seven appearances for the side and scored his first senior try against Kenyan side  just before half-time ... and his second try just after half-time.

Sevens

Du Preez also played some sevens rugby; in 2012, he was part of a Samurai Sevens side that won the 2012 7s Premier League in George and he was also a member of the Western Province side that played at the 2013 World Club 7s in London, in the inaugural edition of the competition.

He joined the South Africa Sevens Academy in 2014. He received a call-up to the senior South Africa Sevens team for the first time prior to the 2015 Japan Sevens as an injury replacement for Philip Snyman.

References

1993 births
Living people
People from Phokwane Local Municipality
Afrikaner people
South African rugby union players
Rugby union number eights
Rugby union flankers
Rugby union locks
Western Province (rugby union) players
South Africa international rugby sevens players
Pumas (Currie Cup) players
Bulls (rugby union) players
Yenisey-STM Krasnoyarsk players